Nicolás Amadeo Figueroa Rodríguez (born 24 May 2002) is a Peruvian footballer who plays as a forward for FBC Melgar.

Career statistics

Club

Notes

References

2002 births
Living people
Peruvian footballers
Peru youth international footballers
Association football forwards
Club Deportivo Universidad de San Martín de Porres players
FBC Melgar footballers
Footballers from Lima